Horta Nord is a comarca in the province of Valencia, Valencian Community, Spain.

Municipalities

Albalat dels Sorells
Alboraya
Albuixech
Alfara del Patriarca
Almàssera
Bonrepòs i Mirambell
Burjassot
Emperador
Foios
Godella
Massalfassar
Massamagrell
Meliana
Moncada
Museros
La Pobla de Farnals
Puçol
El Puig
Rafelbunyol
Rocafort
Tavernes Blanques
Vinalesa

 
Comarques of the Valencian Community
Geography of the Province of Valencia